Asylum (also known as House of Crazies in subsequent US releases) is a 1972 British anthology horror film made by Amicus Productions. The film was directed by Roy Ward Baker and produced by Milton Subotsky. Robert Bloch wrote the script, adapting four of his own short stories.

Baker had considerable experience as a director of horror films, having made Quatermass and the Pit and Scars of Dracula. Bloch had written the novel Psycho, on which the film directed by Alfred Hitchcock was based.

The film was shot in April 1972; it premièred in the UK in July 1972, and in North America on 17 November 1972.

Plot (including cast list)

Framing story
Dr Martin arrives at a secluded asylum "for the incurably insane". He should begin there a new appointment as doctor, but gets first interviewed by the authoritarian warden Lionel Rutherford. Rutherford is in a wheelchair and blames this on an attack by a patient. He declares a lack of hope for any improvement in the patients' condition.

As part of the interview, Rutherford challenges Martin to identify, from among the inmates, "Dr B. Starr", a former head of the asylum, who underwent a complete mental breakdown. Dr Martin is to interview one-by-one the few patients. If his deduction is correct, Rutherford will consider him qualified for the post.

On the upper floor, the attendant Max Reynolds admits Dr Martin through the security door to the inmates' solitary confinement cells, and leads him to every patient, offering for each a few friendly words of background, but no helpful information.

This story is loosely based on Bloch's short story, A Home Away from Home, first published in Alfred Hitchcock's Mystery Magazine and adapted for television on The Alfred Hitchcock Hour.

 Robert Powell – Dr Martin
 Patrick Magee – Lionel Rutherford
 Geoffrey Bayldon – Max Reynolds

"Frozen Fear"
Bonnie recounts the plot to murder Ruth, the wealthy and controlling wife of her lover Walter. Some moments before being killed, Ruth explains her recent infatuation for voodoo and its knowledge of forces "beyond life and death". When her husband hacks into pieces her body and hides the parts in a new freezer in the cellar, the dismembered limbs do not stop moving and begin to attack Walter, until finally killing him.

Bonnie reaches the house and is horrified upon finding her lover in the freezer, rather than the expected cadaver of Ruth. She, too, began to be attacked by the dismembered limbs. 

 Barbara Parkins – Bonnie
 Sylvia Syms – Ruth
 Richard Todd – Walter

"The Weird Tailor"
Bruno is found quietly sitting and sewing with empty hands in his room. He explains he is a tailor by trade, and recounts how poverty and impending eviction forced him to accept the unusual request of a Mr Smith, to produce an elaborate suit of clothing from a mysterious, scintillating fabric that must be sewn only after midnight.

He proceeds as instructed, hoping to settle his rent with the pricey order. When this is completed, he delivers it in person to Mr Smith. The man, however, is penniless, having spent all his fortune on the book with the instructions for the special suit.

In the resulting altercation, Bruno opens another door and discovers the dead body of Mr Smith's deceased son. Mr Smith explains that the magic suit will bring his son back to life, but he is shot by the horrified tailor in an accident. Fearing both the consequences and the appalling story, Bruno stumbles back home after picking up both the book and his unsold suit. He tells his wife to destroy it, but she instead use it to adorn their store mannequin. The magic powers of the suit appear to animate it.

This story had previously been adapted as an episode of the Boris Karloff-hosted television series Thriller ("The Weird Tailor", Season 2, Episode 4).

 Barry Morse – Bruno
 Peter Cushing – Mr Smith
 Ann Firbank – Anna
 John Franklyn-Robbins – Stebbins

"Lucy Comes To Stay"
Doctor Martin is introduced to Barbara (Charlotte Rampling), a pretty but vacuous looking and petulant girl in her early twenties. This is the second patient who is far too young to be Dr Starr. Troubled Barbara and her mysterious best friend, Lucy, a decidedly bad influence, Barbara's brother and the nurse he hired to care for Barbara. Lucy doesn't really exist, she's just a mini-skirted maniacal figment of Barbara's broken brain. 

 Charlotte Rampling – Barbara
 Britt Ekland – Lucy
 James Villiers – George
 Megs Jenkins – Miss Higgins

"Mannequins of Horror"
Martin interviews Dr Byron, who declares his mastery of neurology and other branches of the discipline, and appears to hold Rutherford in contempt. Initially elated by the chance to speak with a new colleague, Byron explains that he has become interested in a new direction of research, which involves the assembly of small dolls said to contain all organs and abilities of a human body, and within which claims to be able to infuse his own vital spirit through sheer will and concentration. Witnessing Martin's disconcert, Byron concludes abruptly his interview and sends him away. With this visit, the new doctor has completed his acquaintance of all patients and he returns downstairs, to deliver his judgment to Rutherford.

This story was later loosely adapted for the Monsters episode "Mannequins of Horror".

 Herbert Lom – Dr Byron
 Frank Forsyth – Asylum gatekeeper

Epilogue
Alone in the room, Byron successfully brings the mannequin to life with his face. The toy evades the room when Max opens the door to bring food, and slowly creeps its way down to Rutherford's office. A few scenes later, it is shown to attack and kill him with a scalpel during a heated argument between Martin and Rutherford, during which the young doctor accuses him of having neglected his patients. Indeed the murder weapon is the lancet that Rutherford was planning to use for lobotomizing Byron.

Horrified, Martin steps on the toy doll. Its destruction, however, reveals its organic, pulsating content; Dr Byron dies in his room on the spot. Seeking help, Martin runs for the attendant Max, and tries to convince him to call the police. Max, however, seems unfazed. While the two quarrel, another cadaver is found. Dr. Starr's true identity is thus finally revealed: the cadaver is the true "Max Reynolds". Starr lost his mind and murdered the real Reynolds two days previously. He attacks Dr Martin and strangles him to death with his stethoscope, then exploding into a maniacal laugh upon hearing no heartbeat.

In the last scene, another new doctor is shown knocking on the institute's doors and again received by "Max". It appears that another cycle of murder and mayhem is about to begin.

Production

Filming
The film was shot at the New Lodge country house, just outside the village of Winkfield, Berkshire, England.

Soundtrack
Though Douglas Gamley is credited as having composed the music for this film, the majority of the score is drawn from public domain pieces by Modest Mussorgsky, in particular Night on Bald Mountain (heard over the opening and closing credits). Selections from his Pictures at an Exhibition are also used: "Gnomus" is heard over both an early display of artworks depicting lunatics and past medical practices to deal with the insane, and during the sequence of Byron's mannequin coming to life and making its way downstairs. The booming crescendo of "The Hut on Hen's Legs" is heard over the sequence where the tailor's dummy is animated and rampages in Bruno's shop.

Release 
In the UK, Asylum was one of Amicus's more popular films. Despite this, it was the last movie Bloch wrote for the studio.

Critical reception 
Allmovie's review of the film is favourable: "Asylum is a textbook example of the skill that Amicus Productions showed for producing entertaining horror anthology films."

Accolades

Home media
After years of releases sourced from degraded 35mm and 16mm prints (the 16mm prints were used for television broadcast), the film finally received a deluxe DVD release in 2006, from Dark Sky Films. This DVD includes numerous special features, including an audio commentary by director Baker and cameraman Neil Binney; "Inside the Fear Factory", a featurette about Amicus Productions; cast and crew bios; liner notes; trailers; and a still photo gallery. The film was remastered from a pristine, 35mm print. In 2017, Severin Films rereleased Asylum on video, including many of the extras from the Dark Sky Films DVD. New special features were added as well, including an interview with Fiona Subotsky, the producer's widow, who discusses his life, and the history of Amicus.

References

External links
 
 
 
 AMCtv.com – B Movies – Asylum (Full Streaming Movie)

1972 films
1972 horror films
Amicus Productions films
British horror anthology films
British supernatural horror films
Films about dissociative identity disorder
1970s English-language films
Films directed by Roy Ward Baker
Films scored by Douglas Gamley
Films set in psychiatric hospitals
Fratricide in fiction
Uxoricide in fiction
Films about Voodoo
Films based on works by Robert Bloch
Films with screenplays by Robert Bloch
Films based on short fiction
1970s British films